Jeanneney is a French surname. Notable people with the surname include:

Jean-Noël Jeanneney (born 1942), French historian and politician, son of Jean-Marcel
Jules Jeanneney (1864–1957), French lawyer and politician
Jean-Marcel Jeanneney (1910–2010), French government minister, son of Jules

French-language surnames